Bromus pubescens, the hairy woodland brome or hairy wood chess, is a grass species found across much of the eastern and central United States, as well as in Arizona, Québec and Ontario.

Bromus pubescens is a perennial grass up to 1.2 m (4 feet) tall. Leaf blades are up to 30 cm (12 inches) long and 15 mm (0.6 inches) across. Spikelets are drooping, up to 3 cm (1.2 inches) long, lacking awns on the glumes.

References

pubescens
Flora of the United States
Flora of Quebec
Flora of Ontario
Flora without expected TNC conservation status